Olivensa cephalotes is a species of beetle in the family Cerambycidae. It was described by Francis Polkinghorne Pascoe in 1858. It is known from Brazil, Ecuador and French Guiana.

References

Hemilophini
Beetles described in 1858